The Pennsylvania National Fire Museum is a museum devoted to fire fighter heritage in Harrisburg, Pennsylvania, United States. The museum has an outstanding collection of artifacts from the hand-drawn equipment, extensive collection of vintage fire apparatus, artifacts, pictures and information about the history of fire fighting in Pennsylvania and throughout the United States.

The museum is housed in the former 1899 Victorian firehouse Reily Hose Company No. 10, of the Harrisburg Bureau of Fire.

References

External links
Museum website

Museums in Harrisburg, Pennsylvania
Firefighting museums in the United States
Fire stations in Pennsylvania
History museums in Pennsylvania